Scenes in a Library: Reading the Photograph in the Book, 1843-1875 is a 1998 book by Carol Armstrong. It is a study of photographically illustrated books from the mid 19th century.

It has been reviewed by The Library Quarterly, Victorian Studies, caa.reviews, and The Art Bulletin'',

References

External links
Library holdings of Scenes in a Library

1989 non-fiction books
American non-fiction books
Books about photography